Huang Ying (born January 28, 1989 in Dazhou, Sichuan) is a Chinese pop singer. She rose to prominence after her fourth-place performance in the 2009 season of the Super Girl contest, a national all-female singing competition in the People's Republic of China.

Career
After getting the fourth place in the Super Girl's contest, Huang Ying, started her solo music career. She was signed to EE-Media, the Chinese record label where most Super Girl contestants are signed. Soon after that, she released "The sun", an EP which contained three tracks, being the title song, the most successful single of that release.

One year later, Huang Ying released her second EP entitled "Splendid Journey", which has got 5 songs. Since then, she started developing an ethno pop style music. Again, a promotional video was shot for the title track, which was used as first single. This EP had a similar reception to her previous work. She started appearing in promotional shows and performing in various events.

After her second EP, the singer went into a five-year hiatus, although she never wanted to leave the entertainment industry. In 2015, after a change of image, Huang Ying returned to the music scene announcing the release of her first full-length album entitled "Flying happily", that will be released under EE-Media, her record label since the start of her career.

Discography

The sun (EP) (2010)
Splendid journey (EP) (2011)
Flying happily (Album) (2015)

References

External links
Official blog
Official Weibo
Official QQ

1989 births
Musicians from Sichuan
Super Girl contestants
Living people